Shoprite (Isle of Man) Limited (trading as Shoprite) is a community food store chain in the Isle of Man. It is a wholly owned subsidiary of Isle of Man Enterprises plc (formerly Shoprite Group plc).

Shoprite currently owns 9 supermarkets in the major communities on the Isle of Man. These stores are branded Shoprite, Little Shoprite and Winerite. The Shoprite stores are located in Douglas, Peel, Ramsey, Port Erin, and Onchan. The Little Shoprite stores are in Castletown, Peel and Ramsey. There is also a Wine warehouse in Douglas trading as Winerite Extra.

The community food stores in Port Erin and Peel have a Subway café.

Shoprite Douglas was the first store in the Isle of Man to install a bar-code scanning system at their tills and the Shoprite group was the first supermarket chain in the British Isles to install bar-code scanning systems in all their stores in the early 1980s.

Its major competitors are Tesco (one store in Douglas) and Manx Co-op (ten supermarkets, mostly convenience stores, across the Isle of Man).

It has trading relationships with brands and  partners such as Sainsbury's, and previously Waitrose and Iceland (UK discount supermarket chain), Subway, Cook (UK frozen ready meal supplier), Peacocks (UK "value" fashion retailer), and Lloyds Pharmacy (UK pharmacy chain).

In 2020, it announced a new long term strategic partnership with Sainsbury's supermarkets, the 2nd largest UK retailer, to sell Sainsburys products in Shoprite stores.

References

Retail companies established in 1972
Companies of the Isle of Man
1972 establishments in the Isle of Man
Supermarkets of the United Kingdom
Defunct retail companies of the United Kingdom